Older But No Wiser is a 1995 album by the Irish folk group, The Clancy Brothers and Robbie O'Connell. This was the Clancy Brothers' final album, released almost four decades after the group's first album, The Rising of the Moon. It was also their third album for Vanguard Records. The songs on Older But No Wiser are notable for their thicker musical accompaniment than was typical of Clancy recordings, as well their first use of female back-up singers.

This was the only album that Paddy Clancy, Bobby Clancy, Liam Clancy, and their nephew, Robbie O'Connell, recorded together. For all previous Clancy Brothers recordings, the group had different line-ups.

Background and music

The inspiration for this album came from the Clancy Brothers' performance at Bob Dylan's 30th Anniversary Concert Celebration, where the group performed, "When the Ship Comes In". Except for this live number, which they re-recorded in a studio, the Clancy Brothers had never before recorded any of the tracks on this album. Liam Clancy performed the most solos.

The Clancy Brothers and Robbie O'Connell focused this album largely on the theme of aging and nostalgia. Three of the numbers, "When the Ship Comes In" and "Ramblin' Gamblin' Willie" by Bob Dylan and "Those Were the Days" by Gene Raskin, were written by the Clancys' old friends from Greenwich Village during the American folk music revival of the 1960s. Bob Dylan had originally based "Ramblin' Gamblin' Willie" on the Clancy Brothers' version of the Irish rebel song, "Brennan on the Moor," one of the group's most popular songs in the early 1960s. The tavern mentioned in the song, "Those Were the Days," referred to the White Horse Tavern in Greenwich Village, where the Clancy Brothers used to drink and informally sing.

Paddy Clancy's one solo on the album, "Let No Man Steal Your Thyme," was a song that he recorded Robin Roberts performing in 1959 for Tradition Records, a small record label that he ran at the time. The numbers, "Roll on the Day" and "Lily Marlene," deal with themes of death and loss, respectively. The Clancys had known "The Boys of Wexford" since their boyhoods, and a few other songs on the album were written by old friends, including "The Flower of Scotland," by the late Roy Williamson of The Corries.

The group recorded the album at Ring Studios next to Liam Clancy's home in County Waterford, Ireland. Older But No Wiser was the Clancy Brothers' first studio album since their 1974 LP, Greatest Hits.

Reception

Patrick Street, writing in the magazine, Dirty Linen, called this last Clancy Brothers album "probably the best studio recording of their distinguished career." He applauded all the singers and accompanists, while singling out Robbie O'Connell for having the best voice of the group.

The reviewer for the folk music magazine, Sing Out!, praised the "Clancy's patented hearty and gusty singing and O'Connell's more sensitive style" on the album.

Track listing

All songs arranged by the Clancy Brothers & Robbie O'Connell and Garry O'Briain.

Personnel
The Clancy Brothers and Robbie O'Connell
Paddy Clancy - vocals, harmonica
Liam Clancy - vocals, concertina
Bobby Clancy - vocals, harmonica
Robbie O'Connell - vocals, guitar
with:
Miss Brown To You - backup vocals
Dónal Clancy - guitar
Martin Murray - fiddle, mandolin, viola
Dave Prim - bass
Martin Cooney - banjo
Mairtin O'Connor - accordion
Tommy Keane - uilleann pipes
Harry Doherty - clarinet, alto saxophone
Donnachadha Gough - bodhrán
Damien Foley - trombone, euphonium
Garry O'Briain - mando-cello
Geraldine Cullen - cello
Technical 
Recorded and mixed at Ring Studios, County Waterford, Ireland
Martin Murray - engineering, mixing
Jeff Zaraya, Sound Byte, NY - mastering
Jim McKague - executive producer
Norton Associates, Dublin - photography
Georgette Cartwright - creative services

References 

The Clancy Brothers albums
Vanguard Records albums
1995 albums